Krieglach is a municipality in the district of Bruck-Mürzzuschlag in Styria, Austria.

It is the hometown of the renowned poet and writer Peter Rosegger.

References

Cities and towns in Bruck-Mürzzuschlag District
Fischbach Alps